Cockbain is a surname shared by Australia's rugby-playing brothers, of which Matt is the oldest:
Brent Cockbain
Matt Cockbain

It is also the surname shared by the English cricket-playing father and son:
Ian Cockbain Sr.
Ian Cockbain Jr.

Australian families